Javier David Muñoz Mustafá (born 11 June 1980 in Firmat) is an Argentine retired footballer who played for Chiapas F.C.  He has the dubious distinction of being the only player to receive two red cards in the same edition of the North American Superliga. He also holds Mexican citizenship.

Career
After playing for Mexican Primera División clubs Santos Laguna, Atlante F.C. and C.F. Pachuca, Muñoz Mustafá signed with Club León as part of its efforts to strengthen its squad for the Apertura 2012 tournament in June 2012.

Honors

Club
Atlante F.C.
  Apertura 2007

Individual
 Apertura 2007 - Best Central Defender

References

External links
Guardian statistics 
 Argentine Primera statistics
 
 
 Statistics at LFP.es 

1980 births
Living people
People from General López Department
Argentine footballers
Association football defenders
Argentine people of Palestinian descent
Argentine emigrants to Mexico
Naturalized citizens of Mexico
Mexican footballers
Mexican people of Palestinian descent
C.F. Pachuca players
Atlante F.C. footballers
Santos Laguna footballers
Real Valladolid players
CD Tenerife players
Club Atlético Independiente footballers
Club León footballers
Rosario Central footballers
Chiapas F.C. footballers
San Luis F.C. players
Argentine Primera División players
Liga MX players
Argentine expatriate footballers
Expatriate footballers in Spain
Argentine expatriate sportspeople in Spain
Sportspeople from Santa Fe Province